The men's 60 metres hurdles event at the 1966 European Indoor Games was held on 27 March in Dortmund.

Medalists

Results

Heats
First 2 from each heat (Q) and the next 6 fastest (q) qualified for the semifinals.

Intermediate round

Note: Both Italian runners missed the semifinals. After a protest by Italy was upheld, this round was deemed to be an intermediate round, with the six advancing qualifiers and both Italians running in the semifinals.

Semifinals
First 3 from each heat (Q) qualified directly for the final.

Final

References

60 metres hurdles at the European Athletics Indoor Championships
60